Marielle Moya Benitez (born 2 October 1981) is a Filipino footballer who formerly played for the Philippine women's national football team. She plays in the midfield position. She is also a sports news anchor.

Early life and education
Benitez was born on 2 October 1981 in Quezon City, Philippines. She first took up various sports in her childhood such as tennis, gymnastics, martial arts, basketball, swimming, volleyball, and underwater hockey. She started playing football when she was on her first year in high school. She first took up the sport at PAREF Woodrose. By her third year, De La Salle coach, Hans Smit took notice of Benitez. Graduating from PAREF Woodrose in 1998, she decided to attend the De La Salle University. She later attained two degrees – in Psychology and Marketing Management.

Football career

Collegiate
Benitez played at the University Athletic Association of the Philippines for the De La Salle Lady Booters. She scored the winning kick for her squad in the final of UAAP Season 61 beating defending champion, the UST. On her junior year in college, she switched playing position from defender to midfielder and started to lead her squad.

She was awarded various accolades at the inter-college sports tournament such as UAAP Athlete of the Year in 2004, UAAP Most Valuable Players trice, and UAAP Best Striker/Top Scorer twice.

Club
Benitez played for SQS United FC. By 2016, Benitez is playing for Green Archers United F.C. and participated in the inaugural season of the PFF Women's League.

International
Benitez played for the Philippine women's national football team. She made four match appearances for the 2003 FIFA Women's World Cup qualifiers. She has made at least 54 appearances for the national team and scored at least 5 goals.

Coaching
By June 2016, Benitez is already working with the Philippine U-14 girls team as an assistant coach to Joyce Landangan.

Non-playing
By 2012, Benitez was already appointed as the Sports Development and Physical Education Director of the Philippine Women’s University. She also works as a television host, sports analyst and football ambassador for Balls Channel.  She also co-presented Road To Rio, a series about the preparation for the 2014 FIFA World Cup.

Personal life
Benitez is as Bayanihan dancer in the Philippine National Folk Dance Company.

References

1981 births
Living people
Filipino women's footballers
Philippines women's international footballers
De La Salle University alumni
Footballers from Metro Manila
People from Quezon City
Women's association football midfielders